Wayne Lamar Gandy (born February 10, 1971) is a former American college and professional football player who was an offensive tackle in the National Football League (NFL) for fifteen seasons.  He played college football for Auburn University, and earned All-American honors.  He was drafted by the Los Angeles Rams in the first round of the 1994 NFL Draft, and he also played professionally for the Pittsburgh Steelers, New Orleans Saints and Atlanta Falcons of the NFL.

Early years
Gandy was born in Haines City, Florida.  He attended Haines City High School, and played for the Haines City Hornets high school football team.

College career
Gandy attended Auburn University, where he played for coach Pat Dye and coach Terry Bowden's Auburn Tigers football teams from 1990 to 1993.  As a senior, he was a member of the undefeated 1993 Auburn Tigers football team, and was recognized as a consensus first-team All-American.

Professional career

Gandy spent four seasons with the Pittsburgh Steelers from 1999 to 2002.

On March 2, 2003, Gandy signed a six-year deal with New Orleans Saints. After three seasons with the Saints, he was traded to the Atlanta Falcons on April 7, 2006 for safety Bryan Scott and a draft pick.

For the 2007 season, Gandy was named as one of the Falcons' team captains. On October 7 against the Tennessee Titans, Gandy suffered a torn anterior cruciate ligament in his left knee, causing him to miss the remainder of the season.

On February 15, 2008 the Falcons released him. He was re-signed on October 29 after an injury to offensive tackle Sam Baker. He was not re-signed by the Falcons during the 2009 offseason.

Broadcasting career
In late 2001 Gandy was asked by WSB-Radio Atlanta to record some vignettes for its "I Am Atlanta" campaign. After the success of the ads, he was encouraged to pursue a career in broadcasting. He started his own syndication company (The Gandy Group) and launched "The Sports Joc Show with Wayne Gandy". The syndicated three hour show broadcasts from Atlanta and intermingles Sports and Entertainment.
The show is currently available for broadcast live or replay and has a live video feed at http://www.TheSportsJoc.com

Wayne Gandy hosted a weekly TV show for CBS-Atlanta Sports' SEC Show with Guy Rawlings from 2011–2012, and is currently a Color Analyst for ESPN TV (2013–present)

References

1971 births
Living people
All-American college football players
American football offensive tackles
Atlanta Falcons players
Auburn Tigers football players
Los Angeles Rams players
New Orleans Saints players
People from Haines City, Florida
Pittsburgh Steelers players
St. Louis Rams players
Ed Block Courage Award recipients